Virajpet Assembly constituency is one of the 224 Karnataka Legislative Assembly constituencies of Karnataka.

Virajpet Assembly constituency is a part of Mysore Lok Sabha constituency. From 1957 to 2008, it was a part of the erstwhile Mangalore Lok Sabha constituency and was merged with the Mysore Lok Sabha constituency in 2008 by the Delimitation Commission. Virajpet was part of the erstwhile Coorg State until 1956, when under the States Reorganisation Act, 1956, it became a part of the Mysore State (now Karnataka).

Members of Legislative Assembly 
Source

Election results

1957 results

1962 results

1967 results

1972 results

1978 results

1983 results

1985 results

1989 results

1994 results

1999 results

2004 results

2008 results

2013 results

2018 results

References 

Assembly constituencies of Karnataka
Kodagu district